The Scarlet Professor is an opera  by the American composer Eric Sawyer with libretto by Harley Erdman, based on the biography by Barry Werth.

Performance history 
The world premieres of the fully staged opera occurred on September 15–17, 2017, at Smith College where the events that inspired the performance took place. The opera was performed without intermission with running time of about one hour and 40 minutes. A symposium on the Arvin case was held all day on September 16. The following weekend the opera was performed with a cast of young artists from the Five Colleges consortium of Western Massachusetts.

Roles

Instrumentation 
The 9-piece instrumental ensemble consisted of piano, percussion, flute, clarinet, tenor saxophone, and strings, with both electric and double bass.

Reception 
Reviewer Marvin J. Ward found  the opera a "compelling and captivating work", adding "...composer Eric Sawyer has a penchant for choosing historical events, especially local ones, as the subjects of his operas. This is the third that I have seen, each more polished and refined than its predecessor, with The Scarlet Professor scoring a 10/10 in my book." The Scarlet Professor won the 2019 American Prize in opera composition.

References

External links 

Operas
2017 operas
English-language operas
Operas based on literature
Operas set in the 20th century
Operas set in the United States
Operas based on real people
Cultural depictions of educators
Cultural depictions of Truman Capote
LGBT-related operas